Gargamel is a fictional character and the main antagonist of the Smurfs show and comic books. He is a wizard and the sworn enemy of the Smurfs. His main goals are to destroy the Smurfs, eat them, or transform them into gold.

Appearance and personality 
Gargamel is portrayed as perpetually stooped, with a worn and patched robe and rotten teeth. He lives in a run-down but solidly built hovel with his mangy cat, Azrael.  He hates the Smurfs with extreme prejudice, though he will feign friendship with the Smurfs if there is something in it for him. He also frequently denigrates, insults, and abuses Azrael, who typically returns Gargamel's abuse and displays amusement when Gargamel is humiliated. However, some episodes of The Smurfs seem to indicate that Gargamel feels affection for his cat and sincerely cares about Azrael.

His conflict with the Smurfs 
When Gargamel first appeared in Le Voleur de schtroumpf ("The Smurfnapper"), published in 1959, he captured a Smurf, which he needed as an ingredient for a potion to make gold in accordance with the famed alchemic legend of the Philosopher's Stone. The other Smurfs rallied against him, and freed the kidnapped Smurf. The sorcerer was defeated and humiliated, swearing revenge by saying, "From now on, the conflict would be personal".

Sometimes, he wants to eat the Smurfs, while other times, he wants to use them to make gold, and still other times, he has even more bizarre uses for them. In one instance, he is so enraged by his loss that he yells, "I don't want to eat them, I don't want to turn them into gold, all I want now is to DESTROY THEM!". Though he often catches Smurfs who wander by his home or whom he happens across in the forest, he does not know the location of the hidden Smurf village, a fact that continually frustrates him.

Some of his schemes to catch Smurfs border on the bizarre (such as a "blue magnet" that attracts solely blue items). He has a seemingly endless library of spellbooks (grimoires), potions, and gimmicks for his life's passion. However, no matter how elaborate Gargamel's plans are, they invariably end in failure, causing him to spout his catchphrase: "I hate Smurfs!".

On some occasions, he has accidentally discovered the location of the village, but sooner or later, gets led away from it due to either a magic spell put on him by Papa Smurf or because of some other bizarre factor. Sometimes, it is simply a matter of his being led away from the village while chasing the Smurfs, losing them and then being unable to find his way back. On other occasions, Gargamel would leave a pheromone trail from the village to his house, but the Smurfs knew to sprinkle cinnamon on the path to keep him from retracing it.

On one occasion, his obsessive search led him to explore the deepest caves, the muddiest marshlands and even go far out to sea. He was just about to give up and go home when, quite by chance, he did finally find the village — but, as always, circumstances were against him.

Rarely (only a few times in the series), Gargamel has acted on the same side as the Smurfs. In "Fountain of Smurf", Papa Smurf becomes a Smurfling, and the only way the Smurfs can get him back to normal is with Gargamel's help.

Gargamel keeps a spellbook called the Great Book of Spells in the basement of his house. The book is a living, sentient thing capable of speech, and due to an unspecified agreement, it must provide Gargamel with any spell he requests one day a month on the final phase of the full moon. The book clearly does not like this arrangement and often takes Gargamel's requests too literally, while instructing him to gather ingredients and perform rituals that humiliate him in the process. In one late season, it is suggested that the Book is not malevolent and simply does not like being used for selfish reasons, as it aids the Smurfs in undoing a magical disaster with very little fanfare.

To try and cause trouble to the Smurfs, Gargamel has created other Smurfs, most notably Smurfette. Smurfette was adopted by the Smurfs, but Sassette the Smurfling, created by the other Smurflings, was made from the same clay that Gargamel used for Smurfette. Sassette refers to Gargamel as "Pappy Gargamel". She is the only one in the Smurf village who wishes to see some good in him.

In the modern adaptions, his goal in the two live-action films and The Lost Village is to extract the Smurf's essence to become the most powerful sorcerer and conquer the world.

Relationships 
Gargamel has also worked with other enemies of the Smurfs, although in many cases, these other villains, such as Lord Balthazar, prove to be much more efficient and focused enemies of the Smurfs. Not much is said of Gargamel's relationships with women, although in one episode, an ugly witch named Hogatha turns herself into an attractive woman to seduce Gargamel in order to steal a magical earring from him, which he bought for his mother's birthday. She almost succeeds, but her constant transformations from ugly to beautiful prove to be too hard for her, and Gargamel eventually is informed of the ruse. One time, Gargamel almost got married. His "mummy" decided it was high time he took a wife and introduced him to a baron's lovely daughter (Andria), who did not really love him. He did not really have any feelings for the girl either, until he saw in her hope chest a definitive map to the Smurf Village and then proclaimed his love for her and accepted her hand in marriage. (Of course, he still did not love her, just the map to the Smurf Village.) Some Smurfs showed up at the wedding and wrought enough havoc to ruin the wedding completely, so finally the ceremony was canceled. In the episode "Gargamel's Sweetheart", he does fall in love with Evelyn, a glamorous but evil witch whom he tries unsuccessfully to impress with his claims of being a rich, powerful wizard, but he does catch her interest when he also claims to know how to turn lead into gold, and gets her to agree to help him catch the Smurfs to do so. Their efforts go unrewarded thanks partly to his bungling.

Cartoon series 
Being the earliest of the Smurfs' sworn enemies, it was inevitable that Gargamel would be a recurring character in the Hanna-Barbera cartoon series. In the opening theme, he shouts out his hatred for the Smurfs and begins his desperate attempts to catch them.

Despite his never-ending hatred and frustration for the Smurfs, more than once has he had to rely on Papa Smurf to help save him from a more wicked enemy's plans (such as Balthazar) or to rescue him from a potion gone horribly wrong. Other times, they have had to team up to fight a common enemy. On another occasion, the episode "The Fountain of Smurf", Papa Smurf drinks too much water from a fountain of youth and becomes a smurfling. The Smurfs are forced to rely on Gargamel to come to their aid and help turn Papa Smurf back to his proper age. Gargamel and Azrael themselves fall into the Fountain of Youth, and become a child and a kitten again, respectively.

In later episodes, he acquired an apprentice named Scruple, who was frequently rejected from a boarding school for young wizards (which Gargamel himself had been expelled from in his youth) and only Gargamel was willing to teach him magic, and only because he was bribed by the wizards in charge of the school. Scruple seems moderately brighter and more savvy than his master, though still inexperienced in the ways of magic. Although Scruple aids Gargamel in capturing the Smurfs, his main problem is with the students of the wizard academy who berate him for failing to qualify for admission. However, in the scheme of things, the smugness of the students proves to be a weakness for them, as Scruple has some success using Gargamel's magic to cause them problems.

In 1989, the final season of the series, where the Smurfs are constantly traveling through time, different incarnations of Gargamel would appear, such as showing him as an Indian fakir, a Russian peasant, or a Spanish bullfighter. In one of the earlier episodes of the final seasons, where Gargamel is shown as an Egyptian pharaoh's aide, Papa Smurf believes that all these similar-looking men (and their cats) seen must be ancestors of the infamous Gargamel and Azrael of their present time.

Names in other languages 
Different names have been used in different languages in the cartoon series:

 Finnish: Velho, directly translated from English word "wizard"
 German: Gurgelhals (literally "throatneck", implying strangling). From 1995 onward, the original name Gargamel is used in Smurf comics publications. In the TV series the original name Gargamel was always used
 Hungarian: Hókuszpók, a wordplay on "hocus pocus", with "pók" also meaning spider
 Icelandic: Kjartan
 Italian: Gargamella (phonetic adaptation of the original name)
 Arabic: شَرشَبيل (Sharshabeel)
 Vietnamese: Lão Gà Mên (phonetic adaptation of the original name with "Lão" means old man)
 Greek: Δρακουμέλ (drakoumel)

Actors

Cartoons 
Actors who voiced Gargamel in different languages are:
 Arabic: Joseph Nano (جوزيف نانو) and Isma'il Na'nou' (إسماعيل نعنوع)
 Portuguese (Brazil): Orlando Drummond
 Croatian: Josip Marotti
 Czech: Jiří Císler, Zbyšek Pantůček and Petr Meissel
 Dutch: Paul van Gorcum, Tygo Gernandt
 English: Paul Winchell, Hank Azaria, Tom Zehnder, Andre Sogliuzzo, Rainn Wilson, and Lenny Mark Irons
 French: Philippe Dumat and Emmanuel Curtil (2021 series)
 German: Kurt Goldstein (Season 1–8) and Henry Kielmann (Season 9)
 Hungarian: Péter Haumann
 Icelandic: Þórhallur Sigurðsson
 Hebrew: Itsik Seidoff
 Italian: Gastone Pescucci, Claudio Sorrentino, and Paolo Buglioni
 Persian: Mohammadreza Solati
 Polish: Wiesław Drzewicz and Mirosław Wieprzewski (TV series), Jerzy Stuhr (movies)
 Romanian: Șerban Pavlu 
 Serbian: Nikola Simić
 Slovak: Andrej Hryc
 Spanish: Esteban Siller
 Swedish: Steve Kratz
 Chinese (mainland China): Ge Ge Wu 格格巫
 Greek: Nikos Skiadas, Giorgos Vasileiou and Tasos Kostis (TV series), Ilias Zervos (movies)
 Chinese (Taiwan): Jia Bu Miao 賈不妙
 Turkish: Atilla Olgaç

Live-action films 
Gargamel is played by Hank Azaria in the live-action/animated film series.

Animated film 
Gargamel is voiced by Rainn Wilson in Smurfs: The Lost Village.

In other media 
Paul Winchell voiced Gargamel on the 1980s animated television series, Hank Azaria portrayed Gargamel in The Smurfs (2011) and The Smurfs 2 (2013) and voiced him in The Smurfs: A Christmas Carol (2011) and The Smurfs: The Legend of Smurfy Hollow (2013), and Rainn Wilson voiced Gargamel in the film Smurfs: The Lost Village (2017). In the Web Novel, "Warlock of Magus World" Gargamel is the name of an early arc antagonist, an amalgamation of spirits.

Jewish stereotype 
According to French sociologist Antoine Buéno, Gargamel is suggestive of a stereotype of a Jew, having a big nose, magic powers, love of gold, and balding looks.

In addition, Gargamel's cat Azrael's name in Hebrew actually means "God is my helper" (in the Hebrew translation, he is called "Hat-hattul", composed of the Hebrew words for "fear" and "cat"). In both Jewish and Muslim tradition, Azrael is the name of the angel of death. In addition to that, it was a Jewish name, so it could be used as an in-joke for Delporte's Jewish wife.

Naming 
The name "Gargamel" resembles François Rabelais' classic Gargantua and Pantagruel, where the giantess Gargamelle is the mother of Gargantua. This is appropriate since Gargamel is a giant compared to the Smurfs. The word gargamelle in French has become a slang term for "throat".

Yvan Delporte suggested the name "Gargamel"; he also proposed the name "Azrael", considering "angel of death" an appropriate name for the would-be killer of Smurfs. He also liked the rhyme with Gargamel.

See also 
 List of The Smurfs characters

References 

Comics characters introduced in 1959
Comics characters who use magic
Comics villains
Fictional alchemists
Fictional kidnappers
Fictional wizards
Male characters in comics
Male characters in television
Male film villains
Stereotypes of Jewish people
The Smurfs characters
Villains in animated television series